Silver Fly Sdn Bhd (doing business as Silver Fly) was a Malaysian airline that flew for a few days in March 2010 and ceased regularly scheduled flights before May 2010.

History 
In August 2009, Silver Fly signed a joint flight service agreement with Riau Airlines for Riau to operate services to Indonesia between Ipoh and Medan, using a Fokker 50 aircraft. However, the agreement with Riau was terminated.

Subsequently, Silver Fly leased two ATR 72 aircraft from Berjaya Air. An initial flight to Kota Baharu in Kelantan was on 6 March 2010.

The formal launching of the company was held on 16 March 2010, at the Sultan Azlan Shah Airport.  Perak Menteri Besar Datuk Seri Dr Zambry Abdul Kadir officiated the launching. The event included the landing of a de Havilland Canada Dash 7 aircraft leased from Berjaya Air.  According to the Ipoh Echo, the launch flight was also the last flight.

References

Additional references 
 Silverfly sedia kemudahan penerbangan Ipoh-Medan,RTM Online,3/1/2010
 SilverFly on the News
 

2009 establishments in Malaysia
2010 disestablishments in Malaysia
Airlines established in 2009
Defunct airlines of Malaysia
Airlines disestablished in 2010